Halone diffusifascia is a moth of the subfamily Arctiinae. It was described by Swinhoe in 1896. It is known from Assam, India.

References

Lithosiini
Moths described in 1896